Malki may refer to:

Given name
 Malki Kawa, American sports manager

Surname
 Adnan al-Malki (1918–1955), Syrian Army officer
 David Malki, writer of Wondermark webcomic 
 El Mehdi Malki (born 1988), Moroccan judoka at the 2012 Olympics 
 Ezra Malki (1918–1955), Greek rabbi
 George Malki (born 1992), American soccer player, has mostly played for US clubs
 Sanharib Malki (born 1984), Assyrian footballer, has mostly played for Belgian clubs

Places
 Malki Bulgareni, Dryanovo Municipality, Gabrovo Province, Bulgaria
 Małki, Kuyavian-Pomeranian Voivodeship, Poland
 Małki, Masovian Voivodeship, Poland
 Morongo Indian Reservation, originally named Malki
 Malki Museum, on the reservation

Other
 Malki Foundation, an Israeli charity supporting families with disabled children 

Arabic-language surnames